Arnt Eliassen (9 September 1915 – 22 April 2000) was a Norwegian meteorologist who was a pioneer in the use of numerical analysis and computers for weather forecasting.

Career
The early pioneer work was done at the Institute for Advanced Study in Princeton, New Jersey, together with John von Neumann. His areas of research included free and thermally driven circulations, frontogenesis, and shear and gravitational–acoustic wave propagation in stratified media.
Eliassen received the Carl-Gustaf Rossby Research Medal in 1964 for his many important contributions to dynamical meteorology. He received the  Balzan Prize in 1996 "For his fundamental contributions to dynamic meteorology that have influenced and stimulated progress in this science during the past fifty years". Two years later, he was awarded the Vilhelm Bjerknes Medal for "his outstanding fundamental contributions to dynamical meteorology".

Personal 
Eliassen was a brother of architect Trond Eliassen.

He is the father of the meteorologist Anton Eliassen. He resided at Bekkestua.

References

1915 births
2000 deaths
Scientists from Oslo
Academic staff of the University of Oslo
Norwegian meteorologists
Carl-Gustaf Rossby Research Medal recipients
Foreign associates of the National Academy of Sciences
Members of the German Academy of Sciences Leopoldina